See also Culture of South Korea, Korean literature until 1945, and North Korean literature

South Korean literature is literature written or produced in South Korea following the division of Korea into North and South in 1945. South Korean literature is primarily written in Korean, though English loanwords are prevalent.

Literature by genre

Mainstream fiction
Also referred as 'pure literature' in South Korea. Most authors translated by the Korea Literature Translation Institute for translation falls into this category. The terminology is often criticized, and is a constant theme of discussion in the literature of South Korea. 

 
Ahn Soo-kil (1911-1977)(안수길)
Eun Hee-kyung (1959~)(은희경)
Seong Seok-jae (1961~)(성석제)
Park Mingyu (1968~)(박민규)
Choi Il-nam (1932~)(최일남)
Kim Jae-young (1966~)(김재영)
Bang Young-ung (1942~)(방영웅)
Bok Geo-il (1946~)(복거일)
Cho Se-hui (1942~)(조세희)
Park Beom-shin (1946~)(박범신)
Kim So-jin (1963-1997)(김소진)
Han Moo-sook (1918-1993)(한무숙)
Hwang Sok-yong (1943~)(황석영)
Ahn Junghyo (1941~)(안정효)
Kim Hoon (1948~)(김훈)
Kim Yeon-su (1970~)(김연수)
Kim Young-ha (1968~)(김영하)
Yang Gui-ja (1955~)(양귀자)
Kim Won-il (1942~)(김원일)
Gong Seon-ok (1963-)(공선옥)
Son Chang-seop (1922-2010)(손창섭)
Kim Seung-ok (1941~)(김승옥)
Chang Yong-hak (1921-1999)(장영학)
Kim Joo-young (1939~)(김주영)
Lee Cheong-jun (1939-2008)(이청준)
Lee Dong-ha (1942~)(이동하)
Lee Soon-won (1957~)(이순원)
Park Wan-suh (1931-2011)(박원서)
Yi Munyol (1948~)(이문열)
Yoo Jae-yong (1936~)(유재영)
Yu Heaon-jong (1939~)(유현종)
Yun Heung-gil (1942~)(윤흥길)
Yun Hu-myong (1946~)(윤후명)
Yun Young-su (1952~)(윤영수)
Shin Kyung-sook (1963~)(신경숙)
Oh Jung-hee (1947~)(오정희)
Gu Byeong-mo (1976~)(구병모)

Korean-American writers writing in Korean, e.g. Kim Yong-ik

Popular fiction
This term, the popular fiction, is defined as the mass market-targeted works, or as an opposite of the pure literature. This terminology comes from the equivalent Japanese word. But since early 2000, the distinction between mainstream and pop became faint, and some mainstream authors like Gu Byeong-mo or Chung Serang are well-received in both genre, and there is a clear tendency of authors refuse to define themselves as the 'pure literature' author.

Historical fiction 
Historical fiction, or alternative history fiction, is one of the largest selling genre in South Korea. For a more serious works, authors like Jo Jung-rae and Park Wan-suh falls into this category. For lighter works, Kim Jin-myung, the author of The Rose of Sharon Blooms Again, is one of the most best selling writers. The historical fiction of South Korea often covers the Chosun Dynasty and the colonization era.

Fantasy 

 Lee Yeongdo (b. 1972): Dragon Raja 
 Jeon Min-hee:  Children of the rune 
 Lee Woo-hyouk: The Soul Guardians (퇴마록, 退魔錄) 
Kim Sang-hyun: Tamguroo (탐그루)
Kim Chulgon: The Dragon Lady (드래곤 레이디)
Hong Jeonghoon : The Rogue (더 로그)
Ha Jieun: Tower of Ice Tree (얼음나무 숲)
Bang Jina
Min Soyeong: The Tower of Storm (폭풍의 탑)

Science fiction 

 Djuna
 Bae Myung Hoon 
 Kim Ewhan
 Kim Bo-young
 Jeong Soyeon

Essayists
Non-fiction essayists include Chang Young-hee.

Poetry
 List of Korean-language poets

Notable modern poets include Moon Deok-soo (문덕수, 文德守, b.1928), Choi Nam-son (1890–1957)  and Kim Sowol, Ki Hyung-do, Chon Sang-pyong.

South Korean literary awards 
 Daesan Literary Awards
 Dong-in Literary Award
Hankook Ilbo Literary Award
 Hyundae Munhak Awards
 Jeong Jiyong Literature Prize
 Manhae Prize for Literature
 Midang Literary Award
 Park Kyong-ni Prize
 Sowol Poetry Prize
 Society of Korean Poets Award
 Yi Sang Literary Award
 Yook Woo Dang Literary Award

References